is a Japanese singer and voice actress from Hyōgo Prefecture. She is currently affiliated with Amuse and her single is released under label Victor Entertainment.

About
Takatsuki was born in Hyōgo Prefecture, Japan. She also lived in Kansai for 15 years, but claimed she can't speak in Kansai dialect. Takatsuki has lived in Ibaraki, Osaka as well. After graduating from middle school, Takatsuki went to Himawari Theater Group where she studied acting.

Takatsuki is the middle child and has two sisters.

Takatsuki debuted as a singer in September 2012 with the release of the song . Takatsuki is also an utaite (one who covers songs and uploads them in Niconico) under the name ; one song she covered is Konomi Suzuki's "This Game," which was used as the opening theme for the anime series No Game No Life.

In 2015, Takatsuki began her career as a voice actress in the multimedia project Love Live! Sunshine!! as Hanamaru Kunikida and currently belongs to its group unit Aqours. Takatsuki also belongs to its sub-unit AZALEA along with Arisa Komiya and Nanaka Suwa. Takatsuki is nicknamed "King" by both fans and fellow Aqours members. However, she has since requested fans not to call her "King", and is now often referred to as "Kinchan" instead, as of September 2017.

Every Thursday, Takatsuki plays PlayStation 4 for Dengeki PlayStation in their NicoNicoLive Community.

On June 10, 2019, Takatsuki announced that she has formed a vocal and dance performance unit called BlooDye, with her as the lead singer.

Works

Voice acting roles

Anime
Love Live! Sunshine!! as Hanamaru Kunikida
Love and Lies as Ayano Katō
I'm Standing on a Million Lives as Majiha Purple
Vlad Love as Kaori Konno
Genjitsu no Yohane: Sunshine in the Mirror as Hanamaru Kunikida

Web Anime
Uma no Friends as Kurige

Video games
King's Raid as Laias
Love Live! School Idol Festival as Hanamaru Kunikida
Love Live! School Idol Festival: All Stars as Hanamaru Kunikida
Toukiden 2 as Megohime; Kichi Saitō

Web Radio
Kanako to Sarara (Chō! A&G+Niconico: 2017 - )

Lyrics
"Yowamushi Signal" from her debut single "Bonjō Cinderella no Shiruke no Aru Onegai"
"Kotoba Tsubomi Signal" from album "Go! Go! 575 Sound & Movie Collection" from Project 575, sung by Yuzu Yosano (voiced by Minako Kotobuki)

Discography

Singles

As Aqours

Covers

References

Song Covers

External links
Official agency profile 

1993 births
Living people
Amuse Inc. talents
Anime singers
Aqours members
Japanese women pop singers
Japanese video game actresses
Japanese voice actresses
Voice actresses from Hyōgo Prefecture
21st-century Japanese actresses
21st-century Japanese women singers
21st-century Japanese singers
Utaite